Wollner is a German language occupational surname for a wool worker and may refer to:
Gertrude Price Wollner (1900-1985), American writer and composer 
Rolf Wollner (1906–1988), German field hockey player
Sandra Wollner (1983), Austrian film director and screenwriter

References 

German-language surnames
Occupational surnames